Büchen is a municipality in the district of Lauenburg, in Schleswig-Holstein, Germany. It is seat of the Amt ("collective municipality") Büchen.

Büchen is situated on the Elbe-Lübeck Canal, approx. 13 km northeast of Lauenburg/Elbe, and 45 km east of Hamburg. Büchen station is on the Berlin-Hamburg and the Lübeck–Lüneburg lines.

History
Between 1945 and 1990 Büchen served as West German inner German border crossing for rail transport. The crossing was open for trains travelling between the Soviet Zone of occupation in Germany (till 1949, thereafter the East German Democratic Republic, or West Berlin) and the British zone of occupation and thereafter Federal Republic of Germany. The traffic was subject to the Interzonal traffic regulations between West Germany and West Berlin which followed the special regulations of the Transit Agreement (1972).

Transportation 
Büchen lies on the Berlin-Hamburg railway.

References

Inner German border
Herzogtum Lauenburg